Bykovo is a rural locality (a selo) in Rossiysky Selsoviet, Shipunovsky District, Altai Krai, Russia. The population was 598 as of 2013. There are 6 streets.

Geography 
Bykovo is located 13 km southwest of Shipunovo (the district's administrative centre) by road. Kalinovka is the nearest rural locality.

References 

Rural localities in Shipunovsky District